Meriden is an unincorporated community in the eastern part of the town of Plainfield in Sullivan County, New Hampshire, United States. Meriden is home to Kimball Union Academy, a private boarding school. New Hampshire Route 120 passes through the village, leading north to Lebanon and south to Claremont.

Meriden has a separate ZIP code (03770) from the rest of Plainfield.

References

External links
Meriden Library

Unincorporated communities in Sullivan County, New Hampshire
Unincorporated communities in New Hampshire
Plainfield, New Hampshire